Country Rap is the eleventh studio album by American country music duo The Bellamy Brothers. It was released in 1986 via MCA and Curb Records. The includes the singles "Too Much Is Not Enough", "Kids of the Baby Boom" and "Country Rap". The title track has been cited as one of the first songs to combine country music with rap music.

Track listing

Personnel
Adapted from liner notes.

The Bellamy Brothers
David Bellamy - lead & harmony vocals
Howard Bellamy - lead & harmony vocals

Musicians
Richard Bennett - acoustic guitar, electric guitar, lap steel guitar, 6-string bass guitar on "Kids of the Baby Boom"
Matt Betton - drums
Wally Dentz - harmonica
The Forester Sisters - featured vocals on "Too Much Is Not Enough"
Emory Gordy Jr. - percussion, lead acoustic guitar on "Hard on a Heart", E-mu Emulator on "Go Ahead - Fall in Love"
David Hungate - bass guitar
John Barlow Jarvis - Yamaha DX7, piano
Dannie Jones - steel guitar
Billy Joe Walker Jr. - acoustic guitar, electric guitar
Reggie Young - electric guitar, lead electric guitar on "Where the Lights Come From"

Chart performance

References

1986 singles
The Bellamy Brothers albums
MCA Records albums
Curb Records albums
Albums produced by Emory Gordy Jr.